Stuntman is a 1994 Indian Hindi language film directed by Deepak Balraj Vij and produced by Poonam Sharma. It stars Jackie Shroff and Zeba Bakhtiar in pivotal roles. It is mainly known for its famous song "Amma Dekh Tera Munda".

Plot
Wealthy Reena falls in love with her brother's (Vijay) friend, Pune-based Bajrang Tiwari, a motorbike stuntman, much to the chagrin of her widowed mother. When Reena adamantly insists on marrying him, her mother attempts to talk Vijay and Bajrang to stop risking their lives as her husband, as well as Bajrang's dad had lost their respective lives living dangerously. She even wants Bajrang to live with her, but he refuses. The marriage takes place, and Reena re-locates to live in the slums with her husband. Shortly thereafter she gives birth to a daughter, Guddi. Then their lives are shattered after Vijay is killed, and evidence points to Bajrang. Reena leaves him and moves in with her mother and wants Guddi to also live with her. More surprises and shocks await her when she finds that Bajrang has absconded with Guddi and she may never see her child again.

Cast
 Jackie Shroff as Bajranj Tiwari
 Zeba Bakhtiar as Reena B. Tiwari
 Avtar Singh Ahluwalia as Avtar Ahluwalia
 Rita Bhaduri as Reena's mom
 Tinnu Anand as Prem Kumar
 Satish Shah as Mastan
 Shakti Kapoor as Roop 'Rocky' P. Kumar
 Sameer Chitre as Vijay
 Jack Gaud

Soundtrack

The music of the film was composed Nadeem-Shravan and the lyrics were penned by Sameer Anjaan. The 7-song soundtrack was released in 1994 on audio cassette, LP & CD in Tips Cassettes & Records Co. The full album was recorded by Kumar Sanu, Alka Yagnik and Sonu Nigam, Bali Brahmbhatt and Suhasini.

References

External links

1990s Hindi-language films
1994 films
Films about stunt performers
Films scored by Nadeem–Shravan